Agneta Prytz (15 December 1916 – 4 July 2008) was a Swedish movie and stage actress who appeared in thirty-six films over the course of her career. Prytz was the wife of Swedish director, Gösta Folke.

Prytz was born Ingrid Agneta Prytz on 15 December 1916 in the city of Gothenburg, Sweden. She worked in many roles at the Gothenburg City Theatre from 1942 until 1946. Her breakthrough film came in the Gösta Folke directed film, Neglected by His Wife, in 1947. Prytz and Folke were also married later in 1947. She continued to be cast in several of his films and TV movies during her career.

Prytz appeared opposite fellow Swedish actors, Liv Ullmann and Max von Sydow, in a total of three films which were nominated for the Academy Award for Best Foreign Language Film: Jan Troell's The Emigrants in 1971; a sequel to The Emigrants, The New Land, which was also directed by Troell; and Sven Nykvist's The Ox in 1991. She also provided the voice of Gammel-Maja in the 1985 animated sequel, Peter-No-Tail in Americat (Pelle Svanslös i Amerikatt). Her stage credits included Who's Afraid of Virginia Woolf?.

Her last on screen performance came in the dramatic short, Gone Fishing (Man kan alltid fiska), which was directed by Angelica Lundqvist and released on 25 December 1995.

Agneta Prytz died on 4 July 2008 in Lidingö, Sweden, at the age of 91.

Partial filmography 

1947: How to Love - Ms. Pimpernel
1947: Maria - Birgitta Bertner
1947: En fluga gör ingen sommar - Expedit (uncredited)
1947: Neglected by His Wife - Tove Larsson
1948: Loffe the Tramp - Anna-Lisa
1948: On These Shoulders''' - Edla, maid
1949: Realm of Man - Edla
1949: Stora Hoparegränd och himmelriket - Lillemor
1959: Enslingen i blåsväder - Lisa Bladh-Bernhard
1961: Lovely Is the Summer Night - Olivia Petrén
1962: Vaxdockan - Ms. Lind
1963: Kvarteret korpen - Neighbour
1965: Festivitetssalongen - Grip's Sister
1970: Ann och Eve - de erotiska - Woman
1971: Utvandrarna - Fina-Kajsa
1972: Klara Lust - Helge's Mother
1972: Nybyggarna - Fina-Kajsa
1973: Kvartetten som sprängdes - Little Mussy
1973: Smutsiga fingrar - Peter's landlady
1974: Vita nejlikan eller Den barmhärtige sybariten - Widow
1977: Bang! - Mrs. Leonardsson
1978: The Adventures of Picasso - Queen (uncredited)
1979: Repmånad - Helges mamma
1980: Sverige åt svenskarna - Mrs. Bengt
1985: Svindlande affärer1985: Peter-No-Tail in Americat (Pelle Svanslös i Amerikatt) - Gammel-Maja (voice)
1991: The Ox (Oxen) - Old Woman
1993: The Sacred Mound - Gestur's Grandmother
1995: Man kan alltid fiska'' (Short) - Lilla damen (final film role)

References

External links 
 
 Agneta Prytz dies 

1916 births
2008 deaths
Swedish stage actresses
Swedish film actresses
People from Gothenburg